Harold Ogden "Chic" Johnson (March 15, 1891 – February 28, 1962) was the barrel-chested half of the American comedy team of Olsen and Johnson, known for his strangely infectious, high-pitched "Woo-Woo" laugh.

Background
Johnson was born of Swedish descent in Chicago to John M. and Matilda C. (née Carlson) Johnson.

Career
Johnson studied classical piano at the Chicago Musical College. He dropped out to support himself as a ragtime pianist in various Chicago-area cabarets and vaudeville houses. He broke into show business as a ragtime pianist and met his partner Ole Olsen, a violinist, when they were hired by the same band. Following the breakup of the band, they started doing comedy and by 1918 were vaudeville headliners.

O&J were given contracts by Warner Bros. in 1930 to appear as the comic relief in a number of musicals including Oh, Sailor Behave (1930), Gold Dust Gertie (1931) and a lavish Technicolor version of Fifty Million Frenchmen (1931). Unfortunately, 1931 saw a backlash against musicals, and their last two pictures for Warner were released without music. In 1936, they starred in Country Gentlemen for Republic Pictures, followed by All Over Town in 1937. Released from their contract, the team returned to the stage. In 1938 Olsen and Johnson produced the Broadway revue Streets of Paris, which starred Bobby Clark and introduced the comedy team of Bud Abbott and Lou Costello to Broadway audiences.

Their greatest triumph was as the stars and producers of Hellzapoppin, a zany Broadway revue, which opened at the 46th Street Theater on September 22, 1938, and ran for a record 1,404 performances. Full of outrageous gags played on stooges planted in the audience (one winner of a so-called raffle had a block of ice placed in his lap) as well as indignities inflicted on actual paying customers, it became a smash hit despite a lukewarm critical reception, thanks in part to the influence of newspaper columnist and radio personality Walter Winchell.

Hellzapoppin was followed by two other Broadway hits. Sons o' Fun opened December 1, 1941, just six days before the attack on Pearl Harbor, and ran an impressive 742 performances. Laffing Room Only opened on December 23, 1944, and ran a respectable 232.

Hellzapoppin was translated into a film released in 1941. Assisted by Marx Brothers screenwriter Nat Perrin, Olsen and Johnson used the film as an opportunity to satirize Hollywood as well as score some impressive riffs on filmmaking convention. The picture, a movie within a movie within a play within a movie, foreshadowed a style of comedy that would later find its way into the films of Mel Brooks, Who Framed Roger Rabbit and TV's Mystery Science Theater 3000. The film is also known for having what many consider to be the finest example of swing dancing ever put on film, performed by Whitey's Lindy Hoppers (here billed as the Harlem Congeroo Dancers) with Frankie Manning. Although the film is tied up in litigation, a Region 2 DVD has been released. Olsen and Johnson's Hollywood career was very much a hit-and-miss affair. Hellzapoppin''', following their string of earlier failures, was then followed in turn by Crazy House, which was then followed by the slick Ghost Catchers, with most of the wildness confined to the comics' nightclub scenes.

Later years
After their final starring movie, See My Lawyer, was released in 1945, the team tried but failed to make its mark on television with Fireball Fun-For-All, a summer replacement for Texaco Star Theater starring Milton Berle. They attempted to make a comeback with one last Broadway revue, Pardon Our French, but the show failed to catch fire and they entered semi-retirement.

With the advent of Las Vegas as a gambling and entertainment mecca, the team was able to find steady work until Johnson became too ill to perform. Chic Johnson died of kidney failure on February 26, 1962, in Las Vegas. He was buried on March 1, 1962, and eventually joined in an adjacent plot by Ole Olsen in  Palm Desert Memorial cemetery in Las Vegas.

See also

 Olsen and Johnson

References

Other sources
Maltin, Leonard. Movie Comedy Teams'' (New York: Signet, 1970, revised 1985)

External links

 

1891 births
1962 deaths
Male actors from Chicago
American male comedians
American male musical theatre actors
Vaudeville performers
American people of Swedish descent
Deaths from kidney failure
20th-century American male actors
Comedians from Illinois
20th-century American comedians
20th-century American singers
20th-century American male singers